Jan Nevens (born 26 August 1958) is a Belgian former professional road bicycle racer. Nevens won the 8th stage of the 1992 Tour de France. He also competed in the individual road race event at the 1980 Summer Olympics.

Major results

1982
 Nederbrakel
1985
 Stage 1, Clásico RCN
 Wavre
1986
 Stage 6, Tour de Romandie
1987
 Liedekerkse Pijl
1988
 Overall, Tour Méditerranéen
 Stage 6, Vuelta Asturias
1990
 Mere
1991
 Stage 4, Tour de Suisse
 Stage 2, Giro del Trentino
1992
 Stage 8, Tour de France
 Geraardsbergen
1994
 Wavre

References

External links 

1958 births
Living people
Belgian male cyclists
Belgian Tour de France stage winners
Olympic cyclists of Belgium
Cyclists at the 1980 Summer Olympics
People from Ninove
Tour de Suisse stage winners
Cyclists from East Flanders
20th-century Belgian people